Assara hoeneella is a species of snout moth in the genus Assara. It was described by Roesler in 1965, and is known from China and Japan.

References

Moths described in 1965
Phycitini
Moths of Asia
Moths of Japan